The 2017 FIBA U20 Women's European Championship Division B was the 13th edition of the Division B of the Women's European basketball championship for national under-20 teams. It was held in Eilat, Israel, from 8 to 16 July 2017. Germany women's national under-20 basketball team won the tournament.

Participating teams

  (16th place, 2016 FIBA U20 Women's European Championship Division A)

  (14th place, 2016 FIBA U20 Women's European Championship Division A)

  (15th place, 2016 FIBA U20 Women's European Championship Division A)

First round
In the first round, the teams were drawn into two groups of six. The first two teams from each group advance to the semifinals, the third and fourth teams advance to the 5th–8th place playoffs, the other teams will play in the 9th–12th place playoffs.

Group A

Group B

9th–12th place playoffs

9th–12th place semifinals

11th place match

9th place match

5th–8th place playoffs

5th–8th place semifinals

7th place match

5th place match

Championship playoffs

Semifinals

3rd place match

Final

Final standings

References

External links
FIBA official website

2017
2017–18 in European women's basketball
International youth basketball competitions hosted by Israel
Sport in Eilat
FIBA U20
July 2017 sports events in Europe